Root-gall nematodes are plant-parasitic nematodes from the genus Subanguina that affect grasses, including cereals, and some other plants, such as mugwort. They are distinct from the Root-knot nematodes which are from the genus Meloidogyne.  So far around twenty-five separate species of Subanguina have been identified, although the most well-known and type species is Subanguina radicicola.

Species
In addition to the type species:
 Subanguina radicicola (Greeff, 1872) Paramonov, 1967 (Grass root-gall nematode)
Other recognized species of Subanguina include:
 Subanguina askenasyi (Butschli, 1873) Brzeski, 1981
 Subanguina brenani (Goodey, 1945) Brzeski, 1981
 Subanguina calamagrostis (Wu, 1967) Brzeski, 1981
 Subanguina centaureae (Kirjanova, & Ivanova, 1969) Brzeski, 1981
 Subanguina chartolepidis (Poghossian, 1966) Brzeski, 1981
 Subanguina chrysopogoni Bajaj, Dabur, Paruthi & Bhatti, 1990
 Subanguina cousinae (Kirjanova & Ivanova, 1969) Brzeski, 1981
 Subanguina ferulae (Ivanova, 1977) Brzeski, 1981 [p. 1484]
 Subanguina graminophila (Goodey, 1933) Brzeski, 1981
 Subanguina guizotiae (van den Berg, 1985) Ebsary, 1991
 Subanguina hyparrheniae (Corbett, 1966) Fortuner & Maggenti, 1987
 Subanguina kopetdaghica (Kirjanova & Shagalina, 1969) Brzeski, 1981
 Subanguina millefolii (Low, 1874) Brzeski, 1981
 Subanguina mobilis (Chit & Fisher, 1975) Brzeski, 1981
 Subanguina montana (Kirjanova & Ivanova, 1969) Brzeski, 1981
 Subanguina moxae (Yokoo and Choi, 1968) Brzeski, 1981
 Subanguina pharangii (Chizhov, 1984) Siddiqi, 1986
 Subanguina picridis (Kirjanova, 1944) Brzeski, 1981
 Subanguina plataginis (Hirschmann, 1977) Brzeski, 1981
 Subanguina polygoni (Poghossian, 1966) Brzeski, 1981
 Subanguina spermophaga (Steiner, 1937) Siddiqi, 1986
 Subanguina tridomina (Kirjanova, 1958) (syn. Anguillulina graminophila)
 Subanguina tumefaciens (Cobb, 1932) Fortuner & Maggenti, 1987
 Subanguina varosobica (Kirjanova & Ivanova, 1969) Brzeski, 1981
 Subanguina wevelli (van den Berg, 1985) Ebsary, 1991 (Seed-gall nematode, syn. Afrina wevelli)

See also
 Root nodule

References

External links 
 genus Subanguina Paramonov, 1968, BioLib

Tylenchida
Plant pathogenic nematodes
Wheat diseases
Barley diseases
Rye diseases